Old Nick can mean:

 A nickname for the devil in Christian tradition
 Niccolò Machiavelli
 Old Nick (beer), from Young's Brewery
 Old Nick Company, a student theatre company at the University of Tasmania, Australia
 A nickname for the Swansea Devil, a wood carving of the Devil in Swansea, Wales

See also
 Nick (disambiguation)